Pollicis longus muscle may refer to:

 Abductor pollicis longus muscle
 Extensor pollicis longus muscle
 Flexor pollicis longus muscle